Sea Hawk or Seahawk may refer to:

Birds
 Osprey, a diurnal, fish-eating bird of prey
 Skua, a group of seabirds comprising seven species

Aircraft
 Curtiss F7C Seahawk, a carrier-capable biplane fighter aircraft of the United States Navy in the late 1920s and early 1930s
 Curtiss SC Seahawk, a World War II United States Navy scout floatplane
 Hawker Sea Hawk, a British carrier-based fighter aircraft of the 1950s built by Armstrong Whitworth
 Sikorsky SH-60 Seahawk, an American helicopter
 Wüst Seahawk, a German amateur-built flying boat design
 Y2Fly Seahawk, an ultralight flying boat

Art, entertainment, and media
 Sea Hawk, a recurring guest character from the animated television series She-Ra: Princess of Power and its reboot, She-Ra and the Princesses of Power
 The Sea Hawk, a 1915 novel by Rafael Sabatini
 The Sea Hawk (1924 film), film based on the novel, starring Milton Sills
 The Sea Hawk (1940 film), film inspired by the novel, starring Errol Flynn
 Sea Hawks (TV series), an Indian series broadcast by DD National
 USS Seahawk CVN-65, a fictional aircraft carrier on the TV series JAG
Sea Hawk, a 1987 shooter video game released by Froggo

Naval uses
 RNAS Culdrose (HMS Seahawk), name of the Royal Naval Air Station Culdrose at Helston in Cornwall
 USS Sea Hawk (SP-2365), a United States Navy patrol boat in commission from 1917 to 1919
 Rheinmetall Seahawk, a model of 20 mm naval autocannon used aboard TTS Brighton

Sports

Mascots
 The mascot of Chief Sealth High School in Seattle, Washington
 The mascot of Delaware Military Academy in Wilmington, Delaware
 The mascot of Peninsula High School near Gig Harbor, Washington
 The mascot of Redondo Union High School in Redondo Beach, California
 The mascot of South Lakes High School near Reston in Fairfax County, Virginia
 The mascot of South River High School in Edgewater, Maryland
 The mascot of Southside High School in Chocowinity, North Carolina
 The mascot of H. Frank Carey Junior-Senior High School in Franklin Square, New York
 The mascot of Anacortes High School in Anacortes, Washington

Teams

Professional
 Bremerhaven Seahawks, an American football club from Bremerhaven, Germany
 Miami Seahawks, an All-America Football Conference team in 1946
 Seattle Seahawks, a National Football League team 
 Seattle Seahawks (hockey), an ice hockey team that played from 1933 to 1941 
 Seahawks Gdynia, a Polish American Football League team

College
 Broward Seahawks, athletic teams from Broward College, Florida
 Cabrillo College Seahawks, athletic teams from Cabrillo College in Aptos California
 Iowa Pre-Flight Seahawks football, a college football team during World War II
 Memorial Sea-Hawks, athletic teams from Memorial University of Newfoundland in St. John's, Newfoundland and Labrador, Canada
 Keiser Seahawks, athletic teams from Keiser University's Florida campus
 St. Mary's Seahawks, athletic teams from St. Mary's College of Maryland
 Salve Regina Seahawks, athletic teams from Salve Regina University in Newport, Rhode Island
 UNC Wilmington Seahawks, athletic teams from the University of North Carolina at Wilmington
 Wagner Seahawks, athletic teams from Wagner College in Staten Island, New York
LSCPA Seahawks, athletic teams from Lamar State College–Port Arthur in Port Arthur, Texas

Animal common name disambiguation pages